USS Skywatcher (YAGR/AGR-3) was a , converted from a Liberty Ship, acquired by the US Navy in 1954. She was converted into a radar picket ship and assigned to radar picket duty in the North Atlantic Ocean as part of the Distant Early Warning Line.

Construction 
Skywatcher (YAGR-3) was laid down on 30 November 1944, under a Maritime Commission (MARCOM) contract, MC hull 2337, as the Liberty Ship Rafael R. Rivera, by J.A. Jones Construction, Panama City, Florida. She was launched on 16 January 1945; sponsored by Mrs. Evelyn Anderson; and delivered 25 June 1945, to the States Marine Corporation.

Service history

Seacowboys

In 1946, after World War II, Rafael R. Rivera was converted to a livestock ship, also called a cowboy ship. From 1945 to 1947, the United Nations Relief and Rehabilitation Administration and the Brethren Service Committee of the Church of the Brethren sent livestock to war-torn countries. These "seagoing cowboys" made about 360 trips on 73 different ships. The Heifers for Relief project was started by the Church of the Brethren in 1942; in 1953, this became Heifer International. Rafael R Rivera was one of these ships, known as cowboy ships, as she moved livestock across the Atlantic Ocean. Rafael R Rivera moved horses, heifers, and mules, as well as a some chicks, rabbits, and goats.

U.S. Navy service 
She was acquired by the U.S. Navy on 20 September 1954, and converted at the Portsmouth Naval Shipyard, Norfolk, Virginia, into an ocean station radar ship. She was commissioned on 29 March 1955.

In July 1955, she assumed her first duties in the Contiguous Radar Coverage System of the United States while operating out of Newport, Rhode Island.
 
In September 1958, the ship's designation was changed from YAGR-3 to radar picket ship AGR-3. Her home port was changed to Davisville, Rhode Island, and she operated from there until early 1965, with Radar Picket Squadron 2, spending over 50 percent of her time on her assigned picket station.

Decommissioning
In March 1965, Skywatcher was placed in reserve, out of commission, and struck from the Navy List on 1 April 1965. She was sold on 23 December 1970, to Daewood Corp., Ltd., of Karachi, Pakistan. She was resold again for scrapping and in December 1971, she arrived at Santander, Spain, to be scrapped.

See also 
 United States Navy
 Radar picket

References

Bibliography

External links 
 

 

Liberty ships
Ships built in Panama City, Florida
1945 ships
World War II merchant ships of the United States
Guardian-class radar picket ships
Cold War auxiliary ships of the United States